Imelda Mary Higham (born Imelda Mary Clabby, 10 July 1974), professionally known as Imelda May, is an Irish singer, songwriter and multi-instrumentalist. Known primarily as a singer, she also plays the bodhrán, guitar, bass guitar and tambourine. She is known for her musical style of rockabilly revival and has also been compared to female jazz musicians such as Billie Holiday.

Born and raised in The Liberties area of Dublin, May began her career in music at 16 by performing with a number of local bands and musicians. She formed her own band in 2002, and released her debut studio album, No Turning Back. After the release, May relocated to London with her then-husband, guitarist Darrel Higham.

Following an appearance on the BBC music programme Later... with Jools Holland in 2008, she released her second studio album, Love Tattoo (2009). She collaborated and toured with a number of artists following its release. Her third studio album, Mayhem, was released in 2010 and earned her a nomination for the Choice Music Prize. Her fourth studio album, Tribal, came out in 2014, and her fifth, Life Love Flesh Blood, in 2017. 11 Past the Hour, her sixth album,  was released on 16 April 2021.

Early life and career
May was born in Dublin on 10 July 1974 in The Liberties in the south inner city. She is the youngest of five siblings, with sisters Edel Foy and Maria O'Reilly and brothers Brendan Clabby and Fintan Clabby. In 1991, she attended Senior College Ballyfermot, where she studied art, graphics and printmaking.

Her career began at age 16 when she began touring the Dublin club circuit and she was occasionally barred from her own shows at Dublin's Bruxelles club for being under-aged. She moved to Great Britain in 1998 and shortly after toured with Mike Sanchez.

Professional career

In 2003, May released No Turning Back. In 2007 she signed a recording contract with Ambassador Records, and recorded her second album, Love Tattoo, which reached No.1 in Ireland and received wide critical acclaim. She caught the attention of Jools Holland, whom she later supported on tour, which led him to request she appear on his music show Later... with Jools Holland. She won Female Artist of the Year at the 2009 Meteor Awards.

On 31 January 2010, she performed at the 52nd Grammy Awards with Jeff Beck in tribute to Les Paul and Mary Ford. She released her third studio album, Mayhem, in Ireland on 3 September 2010, again reaching No. 1 in the Irish Album Charts, and in the United Kingdom on 4 October 2010.

May soon after appeared on The Tonight Show with Jay Leno, Conan and The Late Late Show with Craig Ferguson. In 2016, May performed at RTÉ's Centenary Concert to mark the 100th anniversary of the 1916 Rising. In the UK May appeared on Never Mind the Buzzcocks with the late Terry Wogan and Graham Norton Show and sang live on Strictly Come Dancing. May worked with BIMM music college in Dublin to provide a scholarship (which they named after her) for up-and-coming artists.

May's fifth album, Life Love Flesh Blood, was released on 7 April 2017. She collaborated with American musician T Bone Burnett on the record, who produced the album. Throughout the creative process, May received guidance from U2 vocalist Bono. Life Love Flesh Blood won critical acclaim and reached no. 4 in the UK charts. On 18 May 2017 May performed Life Love Flesh Blood at a special concert in the prestigious London Palladium.

In Ireland, she also had her own music TV show, The Imelda May Show, showcasing the best of Irish and international talent. May performed the Irish national anthem on 26 August 2017 at the T-Mobile Arena in Las Vegas, Nevada, prior to the Floyd Mayweather Jr. vs. Conor McGregor fight. In June 2020, she released the original composition You Don’t Get To Be Racist And Irish which was used by the Irish government for the nationwide billboard campaign Rethink Ireland. In 2020 she also published a new album, Slip of the Tongue, whose style shifts from rock to spoken word.

Her second solo album apart from her former husband, 11 Past the Hour was released on 16 April 2021 on the Decca label. Also in 2021, May contributed a cover of the Metallica song "The God That Failed" to the charity tribute album The Metallica Blacklist.

Performances with other artists

May has recorded and performed with a variety of artists. She has worked with producers Mike Crossey, Tony Visconti, Peter Asher and T Bone Burnett.

She performed at a tribute concert for Bill Wyman's 80th birthday, a live recorded concert for Jacques Dutronc, and a live recorded concert with and for Tony Biscontu for Sky Arts. In 2010 she (and others)  performed with Jeff Beck to honour the late guitarist Les Paul at Iridium Jazz Club in New York City, where the session was recorded for DVD and HBO and subsequently toured the US with Jeff Beck for five weeks. In December 2011 she sold out two nights at O2 Dublin, with Bono making a surprise appearance as her guest. May was the surprise guest in Dublin for U2's homecoming show on the band's 2015 Innocence + Experience tour: Bono called her "the other queen of Ireland" as she came on stage to perform "Desire", streamed live online to millions of viewers.

In 2020, May was part of an Irish collective of female singers and musicians called Irish Women in Harmony that recorded a version of "Dreams" in aid of the charity SafeIreland, which deals with domestic abuse, which had reportedly risen significantly during the COVID-19 lockdown.

In 2021, she dueted with Noel Gallagher and Ronnie Wood of the Rolling Stones in the single "Just One Kiss" from the album 11 Past the Hour, and, together with The Waterboys and the Joanna Eden Band, she joined the line-up for Van Morrison's outdoor show at Audley End House and Gardens expected for 14 August 2021 in Saffron Walden.

Night for Ukraine benefit
May performed at Night for Ukraine, a fundraising benefit held at the Roundhouse in north London on the evening of March 9, 2022, with the funds raised being donated to the Disasters Emergency Committee appeal, to provide aid to people fleeing Ukraine following the Russian invasion. The event was organized by Fabien Riggall in collaboration with the Ukrainian pop duo Bloom Twins.

Acting 
May made her acting debut in the 2022 film Fisherman's Friends: One and All.

Personal life
May married her guitarist and band member, Darrel Higham, in 2002. She gave birth to a daughter in August 2012. On 17 July 2015, May announced the couple's decision to separate after 13 years of marriage.

Discography

 No Turning Back (2003)
 Love Tattoo (2008)
 Mayhem (2010)
 Tribal (2014)
 Life Love Flesh Blood (2017)
 11 Past the Hour (2021)

Awards and nominations

References

External links

Official website

1974 births
Living people
21st-century Irish singers
Singers from Dublin (city)
Irish rockabilly musicians
Irish television presenters
Irish expatriates in England
Decca Records artists
21st-century Irish women singers
Irish women television presenters
People from The Liberties, Dublin